Via.com, formerly known as FlightRaja.com, is an Indian travel portal and online travel company based in Bangalore, India. Via.com was founded on 25 July 2006 and incorporated in February 2007. In November 2017, Via.com was acquired by Ebix for $74.9 million.

History
Via was founded in a small garage on 9th A Main Road, 2nd Block, Jayanagar, Bangalore on 25 July 2006 (incorporated in February 2007) by Vinay Gupta, Amit Aggarwal, Harsh Azad, and Rohit Gaddi.

In 2007, Via received funding worth US$5 million from NEA IndoUS Ventures. This funding assisted Via in expanding themselves beyond airline services.

In 2010, Sequoia Capital provided a US$10 million capital infusion into Via's holding company FlightRaja Travels.

In November 2017, Via.com was acquired by Ebix for $74.9 million.

Activities 
It is a distributor of transportation ticketing, accommodation reservation, packaged tours, corporate travel management and other travel ancillaries. It expanded first into Philippines, Indonesia and eventually to hundreds of cities globally.

The company has established a network of more than 100,000 partners across 10,000 towns and cities globally. The company offers its services through a cloud based technology platform and a 24-hour customer service call center.

References

Indian travel websites
Travel ticket search engines
Transport companies established in 2006
Internet properties established in 2006
Companies based in Bangalore
Online travel agencies
2006 establishments in Karnataka
Indian companies established in 2006